Swimbridge (historical spelling: Swymbridge) is a village, parish and former manor in Devon, England. It was the home of the Rev. John "Jack" Russell who first bred the Jack Russell Terrier.

Etymology
The manor is called Birige in the Domesday Book of 1086, when it was held in-chief from King William the Conqueror by an Anglo-Saxon priest named Sawin (or Saewin), whose uncle Brictferth had held it before the Norman Conquest of 1066. The honour of being a tenant-in-chief in feudal times was generally restricted to great warriors and close followers of the king, but Sawin was given this land in alms by Queen Matilda, wife of William the Conqueror. It was probably part of the royal manor of South Molton, and Sawin was probably one of the priests at South Molton. It thenceforward became known as "Sawain's Birige" which eventually transformed into "Swimbridge".

Description
Before the changes to parish boundaries in 2003, at  it was one of the largest in North Devon. It formerly hosted a number of historic estates.

The village is noted for its church (The Parish Church of St. James; tower ca. 1300) which has been described as a treasure house due to its fine carvings and memorials.

Church

According to Tristram Risdon, writing in the early 17th century, John Mules of Ernesborough built the north aisle of Swimbridge Church, and gave his estate of Furse for the maintenance of it. This is known as St Bridget's Chapel, or the "North Chancel Chapel".

In his will dated 1422 John D'Abernon requested to be buried in the "newly built aisle". This manorial chapel served to seat the household of the Mules family. It is now mostly occupied by the large Victorian organ and the remaining space serves as a vestry. It includes an interesting squint in the form of the corner of a wall being removed and held up with a column, which would allow the family to view the priest elevating the host at the high altar, the holiest point of the Roman Catholic mass. The surviving roof bosses of the North Chancel Chapel display various  arms of Moels, repainted in 1727 as a date shows. Pevsner states Swimbridge Church itself to have been "mostly rebuilt in the 15th and 16th centuries".

Jack Russell Terrier
The parish was the home of the Rev. John "Jack" Russell, Vicar of Swimbridge and Rector of Black Torrington, who first bred the Jack Russell Terrier. Russell is said to have brought his first terrier, Trump, whilst he was studying at Oxford University and then bred from her to eventually originate the Jack Russell strain of terrier. John Russell died in 1883 and was buried in the graveyard of St. James's Church; the village pub is named after him and in 2018 displays one of his terriers on the pub sign.

Railway
From 1873 to 1966, Swimbridge had a station on the Devon and Somerset Railway, which became part of the Great Western Railway and which ran from Taunton to Barnstaple. The alignment of the railway line through Swimbridge station is now part of the North Devon Link Road.

Industry
Leather Tanning was a major local industry until 1965.

References

External links

Villages in Devon